Cauayan Airport (Filipino: Paliparan ng Cauayan, Ilokano: Pagtayaban ti Cauayan)  is an airport serving the general area of Cauayan, a city in Isabela province in the Philippines.  It is one of three commercial airports in Isabela, the others being Palanan Airport in the town of Palanan and Maconacon Airport in the town of Maconacon.  It is classified as a secondary airport, or a minor commercial domestic airport, by the Air Transportation Office, a body of the Department of Transportation that is responsible for the operations of not only this airport but also of all other airports in the Philippines except the major international airports.

Between 1999 and 2008, the airport hosted no commercial flights. Proposals were made to reintroduce commercial service at the airport, such as an independent Manila-Cauayan route, as well as a route further on to Tuguegarao Airport in Tuguegarao.  After almost a decade of not hosting commercial service, Cauayan Airport re-opened to commercial traffic on August 15, 2008, using PAL Express aircraft, marking the return of Philippine Airlines to Cauayan, having stopped its services to the city in 1994. At present, Cebu Pacific uses the Airbus A320 for its Manila-Cauayan-Manila route.

The airport was renovated and night-rated to allow night landings and takeoffs.

Airlines and destinations

Incidents and accidents
Cauayan Airport was the airport of origin and destination for two fatal incidents in Philippine aviation: Philippine Airlines Flight 215 en route to Manila and Asian Spirit Flight 100 en route from Manila.  Notably, it was Asian Spirit Flight 100 that forced the closure of the Manila-Cauayan route in 1999.
On January 24, 2023, a Cessna 206 plane departing for Maconacon crashed in Divilacan, Isabela. All six occupants were killed. It took more than a month for authorities to find the plane, which first went missing at the time of the incident.

See also
List of airports in the Philippines

References

Airports in the Philippines
Buildings and structures in Isabela (province)